The 1996 Tour de France was the 83rd edition of Tour de France, one of cycling's Grand Tours. The Tour began in 's-Hertogenbosch in the Netherlands with a prologue individual time trial on 29 June and Stage 11 occurred on 11 July with a hilly stage from Gap. The race finished on the Champs-Élysées in Paris on 21 July.

Stage 11
11 July 1996 — Gap to Valence,

Stage 12
12 July 1996 — Valence to Le Puy-en-Velay,

Stage 13
13 July 1996 — Le Puy-en-Velay to Super Besse,

Stage 14
14 July 1996 — Besse to Tulle,

Stage 15
15 July 1996 — Brive-la-Gaillarde to Villeneuve-sur-Lot,

Stage 16
16 July 1996 — Agen to Hautacam,

Stage 17
17 July 1996 — Argelès-Gazost to Pamplona (Spain),

Stage 18
18 July 1996 — Pamplona (Spain) to Hendaye,

Stage 19
19 July 1996 — Hendaye to Bordeaux,

Stage 20
20 July 1996 — Bordeaux to Saint-Émilion,  (ITT)

Stage 21
21 July 1996 — Palaiseau to Paris Champs-Élysées,

References

1996 Tour de France
Tour de France stages